Signs of the Times is a monthly subscription magazine published by Signs Publishing Company, a Seventh-day Adventist publishing house, for Australia and New Zealand. "Signs" is an easy-to-read magazine for the general public focused on understanding current issues from a biblical point of view as well as promoting a holistic and healthy Adventist lifestyle.

Signs is related to the North American magazine of the same title, which is published by Pacific Press.

History
Signs of the Times began publication in Melbourne on 2 November 1885 under the name Bible Echo and Signs of the Times. It is believed to be one of Australia's longest-running periodicals, with only the Salvation Army's The War Cry edging it out by a few years.

Awards
Signs has won the following awards from the Australasian Religious Press Association (website)

 2010 – Best Layout - Highly Commended
 2010 – Best Review of Another Medium - bronze: "Making Much of Little" by Nick Mattiske, April 2009
 2010 – Best Article, Applying Faith to Life - silver: "From the Ashes" by Adele Nash, April 2009
 2009 – "Best layout" category: Signs magazine "Highly commended" for being "constantly well laid out with good use of typography and format"
 2009 – Best humorous item – silver: "Another Shot at Saying 'Sorry'" by David Edgren, May 2008
 2005 – Best illustration – winner: "When Liberty Drops Her Torch" by Shane Winfield, July 2004
 2003 – Best Features – winner: "Attack on the world trade center one year on" by Hans Kunnen, August 2003
 2003 – Best Magazine Layout – highly commended: Signs of the Times magazine
 2003 – Most Originality – winner: "Letter From the Future", Robert Wolfgramm, June 2001

See also

Signs of the Times (magazine)
List of Seventh-day Adventist periodicals
Signs Publishing Company
Seventh-day Adventist Church

References

External links
Signs of the Times website
"120 years of Signs of the Times!" by Alan Holman. Signs of the Times (Australia) January–February 2006

Archives (from General Conference Archives):
Bible Echo and Signs of the Times, 1886–1903
Australasian Signs of the Times, 1903– (incomplete, as of June 2007)

Seventh-day Adventist periodicals
English-language magazines
Monthly magazines published in Australia
Magazines established in 1886
1886 establishments in Australia
Magazines published in Australia
Mass media in Melbourne